The boys' tournament at the 2014 Summer Youth Olympics was held at the Youth Olympic Sports Park from 17–27 August 2014.

Results
All times are China Standard Time (UTC+08:00)

Preliminary round

Pool A

Pool B

Second round

Quarterfinals

Ninth and tenth place

Fifth to eighth place classification

Crossover

Seventh and eighth place

Fifth and sixth place

Medal round

Semifinals

Bronze medal match

Gold medal match

Final ranking

Goalscorers

References

Field hockey at the 2014 Summer Youth Olympics